1973–74 was the 27th season of the Western International Hockey League.

Standings

 Spokane Jets					48		31	15	 2				231	175		 64
 Cranbrook Royals				48		31	16	 1				231	193		 63
 Trail Smoke Eaters				48		27	27	 1				203	248		 41
 Kimberley Dynamiters			        48		20	28	 0				222	218		 40
 Nelson Maple Leafs 				48		15	31	 2				174	227		 32

Playoffs
In the "Best of 7" semi-finals:
 Spokane Jets defeated Kimberley Dynamiters 4 games to 3 (4-6, 2-4, 9-3, 6-2, 2-4, 4-2, 4-0)
 Cranbrook Royals defeated Trail Smoke Eaters 4 games to 3 (3-2, 7-6 OT, 3-7, 2-5, 7-4, 5-6 OT, 12-2)

In the "Best of 7" final series, the Cranbrook Royals defeated Spokane Jets 4 games to 2 (4-5 OT, 6-2, 5-4, 4-5, 3-2 OT, 7-4). The Cranbrook Royals advanced to the 1973-74 Western Canada Allan Cup Playoffs.

References 

Western International Hockey League seasons
Wihl
Wihl